Graziano Morotti (born 15 January 1951) is a former Italian racewalker.

National records
 50,000 m walk: 3:58:59 ( Osio Sopra, 10 October 1981) - current holder.

Achievements
Masters

National titles
Morotti won a title at the national championships at individual senior level.
 Italian Athletics Championships
 50 km walk: 1982

See also
 List of Italian records in athletics
 List of Italian records in masters athletics

References

External links
 

1951 births
Living people
Italian male racewalkers
Italian masters athletes
Sportspeople from Bergamo
20th-century Italian people